The Academy of Fine Arts Zagreb ( or ALU) is a Croatian art school based in Zagreb. It is one of the three art academies affiliated with the University of Zagreb, along with the Academy of Dramatic Art (ADU) and the Academy of Music (MUZA).

The Academy was established in June 1907 as the Royal College for Arts and Crafts and initially had three departments, for sculpting, painting and art education. Academy's first professors were Robert Frangeš-Mihanović, Rudolf Valdec, Robert Auer, Oton Iveković, Bela Čikoš Sesija, Menci Klement Crnčić and Branko Šenoa. The Academy is still based in its original location at 85 Ilica street in Zagreb.

Since 1926 the architecture department was briefly active at the academy, and was headed by Drago Ibler. The graphic arts department was established in 1956, the restoration department in 1997 and the department for animation and new media in 1998.

Today the academy has six departments, with a total of 365 students enrolled.

Organisation
The Academy currently has six departments:
Painting department
Graphic arts department
Sculpting department
Art education department
Conservation-restoration department
Animation and new media department

Notable faculty
Antun Augustinčić
Vladimir Becić
Robert Frangeš Mihanović
Drago Ibler
Oton Iveković
Frano Kršinić
Ivan Meštrović
Ivan Ladislav Galeta
Ivan Sabolić
Miroslav Šutej
Milan Trenc
Maksimilijan Vanka

Notable alumni
Marina Abramović
Otti Berger
Ivica Buljan
Vera Dajht-Kralj
Marta Ehrlich
Oton Gliha
Fadil Hadžić
Jacques Hnizdovsky
Živa Kraus
Alfred Freddy Krupa
Edo Murtić
Stjepan Planić
Dimitrije Popović
Vanja Radauš
Željko Senečić
Goran Trbuljak
Ivana Tomljenović-Meller
Seka Severin de Tudja

References

External links 
  

Educational institutions established in 1907
Faculties of the University of Zagreb
Art schools in Croatia
Donji grad, Zagreb
1907 establishments in Austria-Hungary